The Sumgayit FK 2020–21 season was Sumgayit's tenth Azerbaijan Premier League season, and eleventh season in their history.

Season events
On 17 July, Sumgayit announced the signing of Tellur Mutallimov and Elvin Mammadov from Zira to one-year contracts.

On 14 August, Sumgayit announced the signing of Ali Ghorbani from Sepahan to a one-year contract, with the option of an additional year. The following day, 15 August, Sumgayit announced the signing of Karam Sultanov from Caspiy, also on a one-year contract with the option of a second.

On 19 August, Sumgayit announced the singing of Adam Hemati from Pars Jonoubi Jam to a one-year contract with the option of a second.

On 8 September, Sumgayit announced the singing of Huseyn Jafarov from União de Leiria to a three-year contract.

On 18 September, Sumgayit announced the singing of Javid Imamverdiyev from Keşla.

On 27 November, Sumgayit's match against Gabala scheduled for 28 November was postponed due to players testing positive for COVID-19.

On 11 January, Sumgayit re-signed striker Mehdi Sharifi from Paykan, with Hojjat Haghverdi joining the following day.

On 15 January, Sumgayit announced the signing of Dmitri Naghiyev to a 2.5-year contract from Dinamo-Auto Tiraspol. Three days later, 18 January, Karam Sultanov left Sumgayit by mutual consent.

Squad

Transfers

In

Loans in

Released

Friendlies

Competitions

Premier League

Results summary

Results by round

Results

League table

Azerbaijan Cup

Final

UEFA Europa League

Qualifying rounds

Squad statistics

Appearances and goals

|-
|colspan="14"|Players away from Sumgayit on loan:
|-
|colspan="14"|Players who left Sumgayit during the season:

|}

Goal scorers

Clean sheets

Disciplinary record

References

Sumgayit FK seasons
Azerbaijani football clubs 2020–21 season